Freddie Roach (born June 3, 1983) is an American football coach and former linebacker who is currently the defensive line coach for Alabama.

Playing career
Roach was linebacker for Alabama from 2002 to 2005. After his playing days in Tuscaloosa, Roach signed as an undrafted free agent with the New England Patriots in 2006. However he was cut at the end of the preseason.

Coaching career

Alabama
Roach's began his coaching career at University of Alabama in 2008 under Nick Saban as the Crimson Tide's assistant strength and conditioning coach. He stayed in that position until 2010 winning a national championship in 2009.

Murray State
For the 2012 season, worked as the defensive line coach for Murray State.

South Alabama
For the 2013 and 2014 seasons Roach worked under Joey Jones as the defensive ends and outside linebackers coach at South Alabama.

Alabama (second stint)
Roach once again returned to Alabama in 2015 this time working as the team's director of player development. He stayed in that position until 2017, winning two more National championships along the way.

Ole Miss
Roach was recruited to be the defensive line coach for Ole Miss by head coach Matt Luke in 2017. He was there for Luke's entire tenure which ended after the 2019 season.

Alabama (third stint)
After rumors of him going to the NFL to join Joe Judge's inaugural staff with the Giants. In 2020  Roach returned to Alabama's coaching staff for a third time, this time as the team's defensive line coach replacing Brian Baker. There he won another national championship in 2020.

Personal life
Freddie and his wife, Ashley, have four children.

References

1983 births
Living people
African-American coaches of American football
African-American players of American football
Alabama Crimson Tide football coaches
Alabama Crimson Tide football players
American football linebackers
Murray State Racers football coaches
New England Patriots players
Ole Miss Rebels football coaches
Sportspeople from Florence, Alabama
Players of American football from Alabama
South Alabama Jaguars football coaches
21st-century African-American sportspeople
20th-century African-American people